Robert Böhme (born 10 October 1981) is a German footballer who plays for Thüringen Weida.

References

External links 
 

1981 births
Living people
German footballers
Association football midfielders
2. Bundesliga players
Dynamo Dresden players
Dynamo Dresden II players
SV Wacker Burghausen players
FC Carl Zeiss Jena players